Hypoptopoma guianense is a species of catfish in the family Loricariidae. It is known from the Essequibo and Nickerie drainages in northern South America. It reaches 6.4 cm (2.4 inches) SL. The specific epithet of this fish derives from its presence in Guyana.

References 

Hypoptopomatini
Fish described in 1974